Retno Kustijah (born 19 June 1942; as Retno Koestijah) is a former badminton player from Indonesia who competed internationally from the early 1960s to the early 1970s.

Career 
Though she played singles in high level events, Kustijah's greatest success came in women's doubles with regular partner Minarni. They were the first of only two Indonesian teams to win women's doubles at the prestigious All England Championships (1968). Their titles together included the quadrennial Asian Games (1962, 1966),  and the Malaysia (1966, 1967), Singapore (1967), New Zealand (1968), Canadian (1969), and U.S. (1969) Opens. Kustijah also won mixed doubles at the 1967 Malaysia Open with Tan Joe Hok and at the 1971 Asian Championships with Christian Hadinata. She was a member of Indonesian teams which finished second to Japan in the 1969 and 1972 Uber Cup (women's world team) championships.

Achievements

Asian Games 
Women's doubles

Mixed doubles

Asian Championships 
Women's doubles

Mixed doubles

International Open Tournaments (11 titles, 6 runners-up) 
Women's singles

Women's doubles

Mixed doubles

Other Tournaments 

Women's doubles

References 

1942 births
Living people
People from Kebumen Regency
Indonesian female badminton players
Badminton players at the 1962 Asian Games
Badminton players at the 1966 Asian Games
Badminton players at the 1970 Asian Games
Asian Games gold medalists for Indonesia
Asian Games silver medalists for Indonesia
Asian Games bronze medalists for Indonesia
Asian Games medalists in badminton
Medalists at the 1962 Asian Games
Medalists at the 1966 Asian Games
Medalists at the 1970 Asian Games
20th-century Indonesian women